Dock3 (Dedicator of cytokinesis 3), also known as MOCA (modifier of cell adhesion) and PBP (presenilin-binding protein), is a large (~180 kDa) protein involved in intracellular signalling networks. It is a member of the DOCK-B subfamily of the DOCK family of guanine nucleotide exchange factors (GEFs) which function as activators of small G proteins. Dock3 specifically activates the small G protein Rac.

Discovery
Dock3 was originally discovered in a screen for proteins that bind presenilin (a transmembrane protein which is mutated in early onset Alzheimer's disease). Dock3 is specifically expressed in neurones (primarily in the cerebral cortex and hippocampus).

Structure and function
Dock3 is part of a large class of proteins (GEFs) which contribute to cellular signalling events by activating small G proteins. In their resting state G proteins are bound to Guanosine diphosphate (GDP) and their activation requires the dissociation of GDP and binding of guanosine triphosphate (GTP). GEFs activate G proteins by promoting this nucleotide exchange.

Dock3 exhibits the same domain arrangement as Dock180 (a member of the DOCK-A subfamily and the archetypal member of the DOCK family) and these proteins share a considerable (40%) degree of sequence similarity.

Regulation
Since Dock3 shares the same domain arrangement as Dock180 it is predicted to have a similar array of binding partners, although this has yet to be demonstrated. It contains an N-terminal SH3 domain, which in Dock180 binds ELMO (a family of adaptor proteins which mediate recruitment and efficient GEF activity of Dock180), and a C-terminal proline-rich region which, in Dock180, binds the adaptor protein CRK.

Downstream signalling
Dock3 GEF activity is directed specifically at Rac1. Dock3 has not been shown to interact with Rac3, another Rac protein which is expressed in neuronal cells, and this may be because Rac3 is primarily located in the perinuclear region. In fact, Rac1 and Rac3 appear to have distinct and antagonistic roles in these cells. Dock3-mediated Rac1 activation promotes reorganisation of the cytoskeleton in SH-SY5Y neuroblastoma cells and primary cortical neurones as well as morphological changes in fibroblasts. It has also been shown to regulate neurite outgrowth and cell-cell adhesion in B103 and PC12 cells.

In neurological disorders
The first indication that Dock3 might be involved in neurological disorders came when Dock3 was shown to bind to presenilin, a transmembrane enzyme involved in the generation of beta amyloid (Aβ), accumulation of which is an important step in the development of Alzheimer's disease. Dock3 has been shown to undergo redistribution and association with neurofibrillary tangles in brain samples from patients with Alzheimer's disease. A mutation in Dock3 was also identified in a family displaying a phenotype resembling attention-deficit hyperactivity disorder (ADHD).

References

Further reading